Blastopirellula cremea is an aerobic and motile  bacterium from the genus of Blastopirellula which has been isolated from a dead ark clam (Scapharca broughtonii) from Korea.

References

External links
Type strain of Blastopirellula cremea at BacDive -  the Bacterial Diversity Metadatabase

Bacteria described in 2013
Planctomycetota